The list of shipwrecks in July 1855 includes ships sunk, wrecked, grounded, or otherwise lost during July 1855.

1 July

2 July

3 July

5 July

7 July

8 July

9 July

10 July

11 July

12 July

13 July

14 July

15 July

16 July

17 July

18 July

19 July

20 July

<--

21 July

-->

22 July

23 July

24 July

25 July

26 July

27 July

28 July

29 July

30 July

31 July

Unknown date

References

1855-07